Everything's Coming Up Love is a 1976 album from then-former Temptations singer, David Ruffin.

Track listing
All tracks composed by Van McCoy; except where indicated
"Discover Me"
"First Round Knock-Out"
"Good Good Times" (Charles H. Kipps, Jr.)
"On and Off"
"Ready, Willing And Able"
"Everything's Coming Up Love"
"Let's Get Into Something"
"Until We Said Goodbye" (Charles H. Kipps, Jr.)

Personnel
Eric Gale, Hugh McCracken - guitar
Gordon Edwards - bass
Van McCoy - acoustic piano, arrangements, conductor
Leon Pendarvis, Richard Tee - electric piano, clavinet
"Bad" Steve Gadd - drums
Ralph MacDonald - congas, tambourine
Albert Bailey, Brenda Hilliard, Diane Destry, Van McCoy - background vocals
Bernie Glow, Buddy Morrow, Dominick Gravine, George Devens, Jon Faddis, Melvyn Davis, Mervin Gold, Paul Faulise, Robert Alexander - horns
Aaron Rosand, Alfred Brown, Beverly Lauridsen, Emanuel Green, Gene Orloff, George Marge, Guy Lumia, Harold Kohon, Harry Lookofsky, Jesse Levey, Joseph Malignaggi, Mitsue Takayama, Selwart Clarke, Theodore Isreal, Yoko Matsuo - strings

Chart history

Singles

References

1976 albums
Motown albums